The Beyond Coal movement is a campaign  by environmental group the Sierra Club to promote renewable energy instead of coal. Their primary objective is to close coal power plants in the United States, including at least one-third of the country's more than 500 coal plants by 2020, and to replace them with renewable energy sources. The campaign is also active in other countries; for example, they are trying to prevent the construction of the Kosovo C thermal power plant near Pristina, Kosovo; to this end, they have collaborated with academic and Obama administration climate advisor Dan Kammen. Other objectives include keeping coal in the ground, specifically in Appalachia and the Powder River Basin, where the majority of American coal reserves are located, and preventing coal from being exported from America.

The campaign has received at least $80 million from Michael Bloomberg and his philanthropic foundation, Bloomberg Philanthropies. During the early Presidency of George W. Bush, an energy task force convened by Dick Cheney advocated the construction of 200 new coal plants in the United States, warning that if they were not built the entire country would face load shedding as California had just seen. During the Bush administration, the Beyond Coal campaign prevented 170 of the 200 plants from being built.

Europe Beyond Coal 
In November 2017, a similar campaign, called Europe Beyond Coal, was launched in Europe. This campaign is inspired by the US Beyond Coal campaign but is independent of it. Europe Beyond Coal is an alliance of civil society groups working to catalyse the closures of coal mines and power plants, prevent the building of any new coal projects and hasten the just transition to clean, renewable energy and energy efficiency. Over 30 NGOs, including Greenpeace, WWF, EEB, Climate Action Network Europe and many others, take part in the European campaign.

See also
 Phasing-out coal
 Environmental issues with coal
 Powering Past Coal Alliance

References

Sustainable energy
Environmental organizations based in the United States
Sierra Club
Energy policy of the United States
Environmental impact of the coal industry